Jeremiah Chamberlain (1794–1851) was an American Presbyterian minister, educator and college administrator. Educated at Dickinson College and Princeton Theological Seminary, he served as the president of Centre College in Kentucky from 1822 to 1825.

He was founding president of the Presbyterian-affiliated Oakland College, near Rodney, Mississippi, serving from 1830 to his death in 1851. Known to favor abolition of slavery, he was a co-founder with major planters of the Mississippi Colonization Society. Affiliated with the American Colonization Society, it was formed to relocate free people of color from the state to West Africa, in the colony that developed as Liberia.

In 1850 Chamberlain still owned three slaves. The following year he was murdered during an argument with a pro-slavery planter.

Biography

Early life
Jeremiah Chamberlain was born on January 5, 1794, in Pennsylvania. His father, James Chamberlain, had served as a colonel in the American Revolutionary War of 1775–1783. He grew up on a farm near Gettysburg, Pennsylvania. He was educated in York County and graduated from Dickinson College in Carlisle, Pennsylvania, in 1814.

Chamberlain was a member of the first graduating class of Princeton Theological Seminary in Princeton, New Jersey, in 1817. He returned to Pennsylvania, where he joined the Carlisle Presbyterian Ministry.

Career
Chamberlain served as a Presbyterian missionary in the Southwest in 1817. The following year, he began serving as a Presbyterian minister in Bedford, Pennsylvania.

He served as president of Centre College in Danville, Kentucky, from 1822 to 1825. The college was in grave financial straits. To improve the situation, Chamberlain negotiated for the control of the college to be relinquished by the state to the Presbyterian Church, which was effected in 1824. The Presbyterian Church was responsible for the election of the Board of Trustees and the finances of the college.

Chamberlain moved South, serving next as the president of the College of Louisiana in Jackson, Louisiana, from 1826 to 1828.

That year, in 1828, he attempted to found a new Presbyterian academy in Mississippi. Meanwhile, he served as the minister at Bethel Presbyterian Church in Alcorn.

Two years later, in 1830, Chamberlain was appointed as the president of Oakland College near Rodney, Mississippi. The college closed down in 1861 because of the outbreak of the American Civil War, as its students left for war. Never recovering after the war, the administrators sold the property to the state in 1870. The state legislature established Alcorn University there, the first black land grant institution in the country. The old Oakland Memorial Chapel, built in 1838, remains on its campus.  Oakland College was reopened as a secondary boys' school in nearby Port Gibson in 1879 and named Chamberlain-Hunt Academy (CHA) after the Oakland Founder and Mr. David Hunt, a local planter and the most generous benefactor of Oakland. C.H.A. was a college preparatory school until 2014, when it closed its doors.

Chamberlain was opposed to slavery. In the 1830s, together with planters  Isaac Ross (1760–1838), Edward McGehee (1786–1880), Stephen Duncan (1787–1867), and John Ker (1789–1850), he was a member of the Mississippi Colonization Society, an auxiliary of the American Colonization Society whose goal was to send free people of color and freed slaves to their colony in West Africa known as Mississippi-in-Africa. The planters believed that free people of color destabilized slave society. The colony eventually merged with the Liberia in 1842.

In 1850, Chamberlain still owned three young slaves aged 24, 17, and 15, according to the census slave schedules. They likely served his family as domestic servants.

Personal life
He married Rebecca Blain (1792–1836). They had four daughters:
Susan Ann Chamberlain (1820–1834).
Sarah Matilda Chamberlain (1830–1833).
Isabella Chamberlain (1825–1846). She married William S. Hyland in 1844.
Rebecca Clarissa Chamberlain (1827–1857). She married Fabius H. Sleeper in 1851.

Death
On September 5, 1851, Chamberlain was stabbed to death by George A. Briscoe, a pro-slavery planter, after he spoke out against the "peculiar institution." He was buried in a cemetery on the campus of Oakland College. A week after the attack, his killer Briscoe committed suicide. Chamberlain's grave and a memorial obelisk still stand on what is now the campus of Alcorn State University. His wife and four daughters were later buried beside him.

Legacy
In 1879, the Chamberlain-Hunt Academy in Port Gibson, Mississippi, was named after him and David Hunt (1779–1861), a millionaire planter and philanthropist.

Chamberlain's papers are preserved in the Mississippi Department of Archives and History in Jackson, Mississippi.

References

1794 births
1851 deaths
People from Gettysburg, Pennsylvania
People from Carlisle, Pennsylvania
People from Jefferson County, Mississippi
Dickinson College alumni
Princeton Theological Seminary alumni
Centre College faculty
Centenary College of Louisiana faculty
American Presbyterian ministers
American abolitionists
American murder victims
People murdered in Mississippi
Male murder victims
American colonization movement
Presbyterian abolitionists
Presidents of Centre College
19th-century American clergy
American slave owners
1851 murders in the United States